Yanaka may refer to:

22489 Yanaka (1997 GR24) is a Main-belt Asteroid discovered in 1997
Hiroshi Yanaka (born 1958), Japanese actor and voice actor with Seinenza Theater Company
Katsunori Yanaka (born 1971), professional Go player
 Marie Yanaka
Yanaka, Tokyo
Yanaka Cemetery, huge cemetery located north of Ueno in Yanaka 1-chome, Taito, Tokyo, Japan
Yanaka Five-Storied Pagoda Double-Suicide Arson Case, the burning by arson in 1957 of a five-storied pagoda in the Yanaka Cemetery